Ancient Greek Musical Notation is a Unicode block containing symbols representing musical notations used in ancient Greece.

Block

History
The following Unicode-related documents record the purpose and process of defining specific characters in the Ancient Greek Musical Notation block:

References 

Unicode blocks